James Slater may refer to:
James A. Slater, American zoologist and educator
James Anderson Slater (1896–1925), British World War I flying ace
James H. Slater (1826–1899), United States Representative and Senator from Oregon
James Kirkwood Slater (1900–1965), British neurologist
James T. Slater, American songwriter

See also
Jim Slater (disambiguation)
James Salter (1925–2015), American novelist and short-story writer